The Worcester Worcesters, sometimes referred to as the Brown Stockings or the Ruby Legs, were a Major League Baseball team based in Worcester, Massachusetts. Though the team's alternate names appear in many modern sources, no contemporary records from the time exist that support the use of names other than "Worcester".

The team was organized in 1879 as the Worcester Baseball Association, and joined the minor league National Association. The team was profitable, successful against rival teams, and did well against NL teams in exhibition games.  After the season, team management turned their attention on the NL, and pursued the slot vacated by the departing Syracuse Stars. The team was voted into the NL by a majority of the owners, and in 1880, the team began their first season. The manager of the team, Frank Bancroft, and many of the players stayed with the team when it joined the NL, including pitchers Lee Richmond and Tricky Nichols, and position players Arthur Irwin, Doc Bushong, Charlie Bennett, and Chub Sullivan. On June 12, Richmond threw the first perfect game in major league history, against the Cleveland Blues. Harry Stovey, in his first major league season, led the league in triples and home runs.  However, the Ruby Legs were, in turn, no-hit on August 20 by Pud Galvin of the Buffalo Bisons, becoming the first team to be no-hit at home. They played 85 games in their first season, and had a win–loss record of 40 wins, 43 losses, with 2 ties, finishing fifth in the league.

Before the  season, the Worcester team experienced several setbacks. Bancroft departed as their manager, and many of the players also left the team. Mike Dorgan replaced Bancroft and served as player-manager, while Hick Carpenter and Pete Hotaling were brought in as player replacements. Further complications arose during the season: the popular Sullivan was sick with tuberculosis, and on August 19, shortstop Irwin broke his leg. This presented a problem for that day's game, because his backup, Buttercup Dickerson, was also injured at the time. As a solution, local sports equipment dealer Martin "Flip" Flaherty was used to help field a full team. Matters did not improve the following month: Lip Pike was accused of conspiring to throw baseball games, and was later expelled by the NL, and Sullivan succumbed to tuberculosis. To commemorate their teammate, the team wore a black crape on their sleeve, which began baseball's tradition of honoring the recently deceased in this manner.  Dorgan departed the team before the season ended, and Stovey took over the on-field managerial duties, while also continuing his playing role. The team finished with a record of 32 wins, 50 losses, with 1 tie, finishing last among the eight teams in the league.

In 1882, the team's decline continued, and the pitchers began to complain of exhaustion and accused management of overuse. A second consecutive last-place finish, along with declining talent, their fans stopped attending home games, with attendance numbers averaging 50 paid spectators. John Clarkson, who went on to win 328 games in a 12-season career, and was the only Hall of Famer to have played for the franchise, began his career for the 1881 Ruby Legs. When the season ended, the NL decided to drop the team from the league, replacing them with the Philadelphia Quakers, who later became the Phillies.

Keys

Players

References
General
Gordon, Robert. 2005. Legends of the Philadelphia Phillies. Sports Publishing LLC. 
Gordon, Robert; Tom Burgoyne. 2005. Movin' on Up: Baseball and Philadelphia Then, Now, and Always. B B& A Publishers. .
Foulds, Alan E. 2005. Boston's ballparks & arenas. University Press of New England. .
Specific

External links
Franchise index at Baseball-Reference and Retrosheet

Major League Baseball all-time rosters